Bernard Perlin was an American painter. He is primarily known for creating pro-war art during World War II and magic realism paintings of urban American life.

Early life and education 

Perlin was born in Richmond, Virginia in 1918 to Davis and Anna Schireff Perlin. His parents were Jewish immigrants from Russia, and his father died when Perlin was 10 years old. Perlin grew up with two older sisters, Mildred and Jeanette. At the encouragement of a high school teacher, he was enrolled in the New York School of Design. He studied there from 1934 to 1936, the National Academy of Design with Leon Kroll in 1937, and then the Arts Student League with Isabel Bishop, William Palmer, and Harry Sternberg until 1940. In 1938, he was awarded the Kosciusko Foundation Award to study in Poland.

Career 

Perlin was rejected from service in the United States military because he was openly gay. He entered the graphics department of the Office of War Information in 1942, creating pro-war propaganda popular in the United States. The department was shut down in 1943 due to budgetary issues.

He continued his focus on war as an artist-correspondent for Life Magazine from 1943–1944 and then again for Fortune Magazine in 1945. As an artist-correspondent for Life, he brought back to the U.S. the first news and sketches obtained in Greece since the German occupation began in 1941.

His two most notable wartime pieces, both created in 1943, are arguably his "Let Em Have It" war bonds ad, which depicts a soldier throwing a grenade, and "Americans Will Always Fight for Liberty," a painting of World War II soldiers marching in front of Continental Army soldiers.

In 1939, he painted a country scene on a post office wall for the US Treasury. After the war, his work began to focus on magic realism, aiming to capture special moments in everyday life. He produced his most famous work, Orthodox Boys, in 1948. The painting depicts two Jewish boys standing in front of a subway graffiti backdrop. In 1950, it was the first postwar work by an American artist to be acquired by Tate.

Perlin moved to Italy for six years, and his work became more brightly colored. After moving back to New York City, Perlin grew distasteful towards the competitive culture of the city's art scene. He moved to Ridgefield, Connecticut, and continued to paint until the 1970s.  After several years of retirement, a friend encouraged Mr. Perlin back to the canvas in 2012, and after completing two new pieces the Chair and the Maiden Gallery (New York City) hosted a retrospective of Mr. Perlin's work in 2013.

In 1968, Bernard Perlin commemorated Mayor Richard J. Daley and the 1968 Democratic National Convention, which was held in Chicago, in a work entitled Mayor Daley. This example of Perlin's work has been used by educators to teach about the Vietnam War. The painting is currently at the Columbus Museum of Art.

Personal life 
In 2009, Perlin married Edward Newell, his partner of 54 years. When he stopped painting, Perlin took up growing flowers.

Perlin died at the age of 95 in 2014 in his home in Ridgefield.

Awards and honors

He received Guggenheim Fellowships in 1954 and 1959.

Legacy 
Examples of his work are in a number of museums and libraries, including the Smithsonian Institution, the Museum of Modern Art, the Whitney Museum of American Art, the Art Institute of Chicago, and the Pritzker Military Museum & Library.

References

External links 
 Image of Bernard Perlin.
Bernard Perlin
Poster Art of World War II
Paintings
Avenge December 7
Bernard Perlin, a New York Painter of Varied Styles, Dies at 95
Bernard Perlin 1918–2014
War Posters of the 20th Century
Bernard Perlin Papers. Yale Collection of American Literature, Beinecke Rare Book and Manuscript Library.

1918 births
2014 deaths
American war artists
American gay artists
World War II artists
Life (magazine) people
American people of Russian-Jewish descent
Jewish American artists
20th-century American painters
American male painters
People of the United States Office of War Information
20th-century American male artists
Artists from Richmond, Virginia
Painters from Virginia
LGBT people from Virginia
21st-century American Jews
21st-century American LGBT people